A number of news broadcasts were referred to as Southern Cross News, including:

 Southern Cross News (now Nightly News 7 Tasmania), regional news on Seven Tasmania (formerly Southern Cross Tasmania), broadcast from Launceston, Tasmania
 Southern Cross News (now Nightly News 7 GTS/BKN), regional news on Seven GTS/BKN (formerly Southern Cross GTS/BKN), broadcast from Port Pirie, South Australia
 Southern Cross News (now 7 News updates on Seven stations and now 10 News First news updates on 10 stations), radio and television news updates by Southern Cross Austereo, broadcast from Launceston & Hobart, Tasmania, Australia

See also
Southern Cross (disambiguation)